Odette Mistoul (married Kingbou; born 22 February 1959) is a Gabonese former track and field athlete who competed in the shot put. She represented her country at the 1984 Los Angeles Olympics, coming 13th in the final. She was her nation's Olympic flag bearer that year. She was the first woman to represent Gabon at the Olympics. She won the first three gold medals in women's shot put at the African Championships in Athletics from 1979 to 1984.

She participated at the inaugural 1983 World Championships in Athletics and was a finalist at the 1979 IAAF World Cup. In other competitions, she was twice winner at the Central African Athletics Championships and took bronze at the 1985 African Championships in Athletics.

After retirement from athletics, she remained involved in the sport and stood as a candidate for the women's committee for the International Association of Athletics Federations.

International competitions

See also
List of champions of the African Championships in Athletics
Gabon at the 1984 Summer Olympics

References

External links

Living people
1959 births
Gabonese shot putters
Gabonese female athletes
Female shot putters
Olympic athletes of Gabon
Athletes (track and field) at the 1984 Summer Olympics
World Athletics Championships athletes for Gabon
Gabonese referees and umpires
21st-century Gabonese people